USS Grand Rapids (PF-31), a , was the first ship of the United States Navy to be named for Grand Rapids, Michigan.

Construction
Grand Rapids (PF-31), formerly designated PG-139, was launched at Walter Butler Shipbuilders, Inc., in Superior, Wisconsin, on 10 September 1943, sponsored by Mrs. Ted Booth; and commissioned on 10 October 1944. The ship had been taken down the Mississippi River and outfitted at Plaquemine, Louisiana, before being commissioned at New Orleans.

Service history
Outfitted as a weather ship, Grand Rapids sailed on 17 October for Bermuda and her shakedown cruise, but was damaged at sea by a hurricane and returned to Algiers, Louisiana, for repairs.  After repairs were completed, she proceeded toward Bermuda again on 27 October, and after her shakedown training put in at Boston, Massachusetts, on 4 December 1944.  Grand Rapids steamed out of Boston on 6 January 1945 for duty as a weather picket ship off Newfoundland.

Grand Rapids operated as a weather ship out of NS Argentia until returning to Boston on 6 June 1945.  The ship soon sailed for her station on 7 July, and continued sending vital weather reports for the North Atlantic area until finally returning to Boston on 15 January 1946.  Grand Rapids decommissioned at Boston on 10 April 1946, was sold to Sun Shipbuilding & Dry Dock Company, Chester, Pennsylvania, on 14 April 1947, and subsequently scrapped.

References

External links  
 
hazegray.org: USS Grand Rapids

Tacoma-class frigates
World War II patrol vessels of the United States
Ships built in Superior, Wisconsin
1943 ships
Weather ships